The Juno Awards of 2012 honoured Canadian music industry achievements in the latter part of 2010 and in most of 2011. The awards were presented in Ottawa, Ontario, Canada during the weekend of 31 March and 1 April 2012. A week of related events began on 26 March 2012.

Blue Rodeo was inducted into the Canadian Music Hall of Fame. Broadcast executive Gary Slaight was designated the 2012 recipient of the Walt Grealis Special Achievement Award.

Bidding
Ottawa's bid for the awards became known in March 2011 when it was revealed the province of Ontario allocated $100,000 in funding towards the city's 2012 Juno Awards bid. The bid was jointly supported by the city, the province and the National Capital Commission. Ottawa hosted the awards on one other occasion, in 2003.

Montreal was also considered as a 2012 host city. There was a bid from Victoria, British Columbia for the 2013 awards which was since granted to Regina. Victoria then planned a bid for 2014.

Events
The Juno Cup charity hockey game between a team of musicians and a team of former National Hockey League players was held at Nepean Sportsplex on 30 March.

Winners of most award categories were announced at a private gala on 31 March at the Ottawa Convention Centre.

On 1 April, prior to the main ceremony, Dan Mangan hosted a songwriters' event at Centrepointe Theatre featuring Kiran Ahluwalia, Terri Clark, David Francey, Max Kerman of Arkells, Kardinall Offishall and Lindi Ortega.

Main ceremony performers
William Shatner hosted the main ceremony at Scotiabank Place.
The following artists performed:

 Anjulie
 Blue Rodeo
 City and Colour
 deadmau5 with Lights, MC Flipside
 Dragonette
 Feist
 Hedley
 Hey Rosetta!
 JRDN
 K'naan
 Mia Martina
 Sarah McLachlan
 Nickelback
 Alyssa Reid
 Simple Plan

Nominees and winners
Nominations for the various award categories were announced on 7 February 2012. Most awards were announced at the private gala on 31 March. The remaining eight categories were announced the following day on the main televised ceremony. Two Christmas holiday albums were nominated for the Album of the Year award: Christmas by Michael Bublé and Under the Mistletoe by Justin Bieber. A Metal/Hard Music Album of the Year category was introduced for the 2012 awards.

People

Juno Fan Choice Award
 Justin Bieber
Arcade Fire
Michael Bublé
City and Colour
Deadmau5
Drake
Hedley
Avril Lavigne
Nickelback
Ginette Reno

Artist of the Year
 Feist
City and Colour
Deadmau5
Drake
Michael Bublé

Group of the Year
 Arkells
Down with Webster
Hedley
Nickelback
Sam Roberts Band

New Artist of the Year
 Dan Mangan
Diamond Rings
JRDN
Lindi Ortega
Alyssa Reid

New Group of the Year
 The Sheepdogs
Braids
Hey Rosetta!
Mother Mother
The Rural Alberta Advantage

Jack Richardson Producer of the Year
 Brian Howes ("Heaven's Gonna Wait", Hedley and "Trying Not to Love You", Nickelback)
David Foster ("White Christmas", Michael Bublé)
k.d. lang ("I Confess" and "Sugar Buzz", k.d. lang)
Bob Rock ("Only the Lonely", Jann Arden)
Noah "40" Shebib ("Marvin's Room" and "Take Care", Drake)

Recording Engineer of the Year
 George Seara ("A Little Bit of Love", Michael Kaeshammer and "Let Go", Laila Biali)
Chris Shreenan-Dyck ("Everybody Watched the Wedding" and "Watch Yourself Go", Jim Cuddy)
David Travers-Smith ("All the Stars", The Wailin' Jennys and "Soon the Birds", Oh Susanna)
Michael Phillip Wojewoda ("Circle" and "Mama", Paisley Jura)
Jeff Wolpert ("You're Not Alone" and "Cosmic Ballet", Sarah Slean)

Songwriter of the Year
 Dallas Green, "Fragile Bird", "We Found Each Other" and "Weightless"
Jim Cuddy, "Everyone Watched the Wedding", "Skyscraper Soul" and "Watch Yourself Go Down"
Feist, "How Come You Never Go There", "Graveyard" and "The Circle Married the Line"
Dan Mangan, "About as Helpful As You Can Be Without Being Any Help at All", "Post-War Blues" and "Oh Fortune"
Ron Sexsmith, "Get in Line", "Believe it When I See It" and "Middle of Love"

Allan Waters Humanitarian Award
 Simple Plan

Albums

Album of the Year
 Michael Bublé, Christmas
Justin Bieber, Under the Mistletoe
Drake, Take Care
Avril Lavigne, Goodbye Lullaby
Nickelback, Here and Now

Aboriginal Album of the Year
 Murray Porter, Songs Lived and Life Played
Bruthers of Different Muthers, Speakers of Tomorrow
Flying Down Thunder and Rise Ashen, One Nation
Donny Parenteau, To Whom it May Concern
Randy Wood, The Gift of Life

Adult Alternative Album of the Year
 Feist, Metals
Jim Cuddy, Skyscraper Soul
Cuff the Duke, Morning Comes
Jenn Grant, Honeymoon Punch
Ron Sexsmith, Long Player Late Bloomer

Alternative Album of the Year
 Dan Mangan, Oh Fortune
Braids, Native Speaker
Destroyer, Kaputt
Fucked Up, David Comes to Life
Timber Timbre, Creep on Creepin' On

Blues Album of the Year
 MonkeyJunk, To Behold
Bill Johnson, Still Blue
David Gogo, Soul Bender
Harrison Kennedy, Shame the Devil
Suzie Vinnick, Me 'n' Mabel

Children's Album of the Year
 Charlie Hope, Songs, Stories and Friends: Let's Go Play!
Bobs & Lolo, Connecting the Dots
Eddie Douglas, Sleepy Sky Lullaby
Music with Brian, Everyone
Vocal Paint, My Butterfly/A Cappella Lullabies

Classical Album of the Year (solo or chamber ensemble) 
 Marc-André Hamelin, Liszt Piano Sonata
Canadian Brass, Brahms on Brass
Susan Hoeppner, American Flute Masterpieces
Louis Lortie, Louis Lortie Plays Liszt
New Orford String Quartet, Schubert and Beethoven

Classical Album of the Year (large ensemble) 
 Alexandre Da Costa with the Orchestre Symphonique de Montréal, Daugherty: Fire and Blood
James Ehnes, Bartók Violin Concertos
Yannick Nézet-Séguin with the Orchestre Métropolitain, Bruckner 4
Yannick Nézet-Séguin with the Orchestre Métropolitain, Florent Schmidt: La tragédie de Salomé
Jean-Guihen Queyras, Vivaldi Cello Concertos

Classical Album of the Year (vocal or choral performance) 
 Jane Archibald with the Orchestre Symphonique Bienne (Thomas Rösner, conductor), Haydn Arias
Karina Gauvin and Marie-Nicole Lemieux, Handel: Streams of Pleasure
Marie-Josée Lord and the Orchestre Métropolitain (Giuseppe Pietraroia, conductor), Marie-Josée Lord
Le Nouvel Opéra, Caldara: La Conversione di Clodoveo
Tafelmusik Baroque Orchestra with Daniel Taylor, J.S. Bach: Cantatas 70 & 154; Concerto 1060; Orchestral Suite No. 2

Contemporary Christian/Gospel Album of the Year 
 Downhere, On the Altar of Love
Jon Bauer, Forevermore
Hawk Nelson, Crazy Love
Kellie Loder, Imperfections & Directions
Sky Terminal, Don't Close Your Eyes

Country Album of the Year
 Terri Clark, Roots and Wings
Doc Walker, 16 & 1
High Valley, High Valley
Jason McCoy, Everything
Jimmy Rankin, Forget About the World

Electronic Album of the Year
 Tim Hecker, Ravedeath, 1972
Austra, Feel It Break
Azari & III, Azari & III
Junior Boys, It's All True
Arthur Oskan, A Little More Than Everything

Francophone Album of the Year
 Malajube, La caverne
Cœur de pirate, Blonde
Catherine Major, Le Désert des solitudes
Jérôme Minière, Le vrai le faux
Fred Pellerin, C'est un monde

Instrumental Album of the Year
 Stretch Orchestra, Stretch Orchestra
Andrew Collins, Cats & Dogs
MAZ, Téléscope
L'Orkestre des Pas Perdus, L'Âge du cuivre
Colin Stetson, New History Warfare Vol. 2: Judges

International Album of the Year
 Adele, 21
Coldplay, Mylo Xyloto
Lady Gaga, Born This Way
LMFAO, Sorry for Party Rocking
Rihanna, Loud

Contemporary Jazz Album of the Year
 Phil Dwyer Orchestra feat. Mark Fewer, Changing Seasons
Hilario Durán and Jane Bunnett, Cuban Rhapsody
François Bourassa Quartet, Idiosyncrasie
Colin Stetson, New History Warfare Vol. 2: Judges
Chris Tarry, Rest of the Story

Traditional Jazz Album of the Year
 David Braid, Verge
Dave Young Quintet, Aspects of Oscar
Oliver Jones, Live in Baden
Kirk MacDonald Orchestra, Deep Shadows
Mike Murley Septet, Still RollinVocal Jazz Album of the Year
 Sonia Johnson, Le Carré de nos amoursFern Lindzon, Two Kites
Sophie Milman, In the Moonlight
The Nylons, Skin Tight
Diana Panton, To Brazil with Love

Metal/Hard Music Album of the Year
 KEN mode, VenerableAnvil, Juggernaut of Justice
Cauldron, Burning Fortune
Fuck the Facts, Die Miserable
Devin Townsend, Deconstruction

Pop Album of the Year
 Hedley, StormsDown with Webster, Time to Win, Vol. 2
Avril Lavigne, Goodbye Lullaby
Lights, Siberia
Marianas Trench, Ever After

Rap Recording of the Year
 Drake, Take CareClassified, Handshakes and Middle Fingers
D-Sisive, Jonestown 2: Jimmy Go Bye-Bye
Kardinal Offishall, Anywhere (Ol' Time Killin' Pt. 2)
Swollen Members, Dagger Mouth

Rock Album of the Year
 The Sheepdogs, Learn & BurnArkells, Michigan Left
Matthew Good, Lights of Endangered Species
Sam Roberts, Collider
Sloan, The Double Cross

Roots and Traditional Album of the Year (solo)
 Bruce Cockburn, Small Source of ComfortCraig Cardiff, Floods & Fires
David Francey, Late Edition
Dave Gunning, A Tribute to John Allan Cameron
Lindi Ortega, Little Red Boots

Roots and Traditional Album of the Year (group)
 The Wailin' Jennys, Bright Morning StarsThe Deep Dark Woods, The Place I Left Behind
The Good Lovelies, Let the Rain Fall
The Once, Row Upon Row of the People They Know
Twilight Hotel, When the Wolves Go Blind

World Music Album of the Year
 Kiran Ahluwalia, Aam Zameen: Common GroundAzam Ali, From Night to the Edge of Day
Aboulaye Kone and Bolo Kan, Afo Gné
Aline Morales, Flores, Tambores e Amores
Socalled, Sleepover

Songs

Single of the Year
 The Sheepdogs, "I Don't Know"City and Colour, "Fragile Bird"
Hedley, "Invincible"
Nickelback, "When We Stand Together"
Johnny Reid, "Let's Go Higher"

Classical Composition of the Year
 Derek Charke, "Sepia Fragments"Jacques Hétu, "String Quartet No. 2"
Jeffrey Ryan, "Fugitive Colours"
Heather Schmidt, "Piano Concerto No. 2"
Ann Southam, "Glass Houses #5"

Dance Recording of the Year
 Martin Solveig and Dragonette, "Hello"Anjulie, "Brand New Chick"
Deadmau5, "Aural Psynapse"
Duck Sauce, "Barbra Streisand"
Mia Martina, Devotion

R&B/Soul Recording of the Year
 Melanie Fiona, "Gone and Never Coming Back"Jully Black, "Set it Off (feat. Kardinal Offishall)"
JRDN, IAMJRDN
Robin Thicke, "Pretty Lil Heart (feat. Lil Wayne)"
Karl Wolf, "Ghetto Love (feat. Kardinal Offishall)"

 Reggae Recording of the Year 
 Exco Levi, "Bleaching Shop"Jay Douglas, "Lover's Paradise"
Dubmatix, "Seeds of Love & Life"
Tanya Mullings, "Rescue Me"
Steele, "Woman"

Other

Music DVD of the Year
 Feist: Look at What the Light Did Now (Anthony Seck, Janine McInnes and Chip Sutherland)David Francey: Burning Bright (Tony Girardin)
Peter Katz: Live at the Music Gallery (Tim Martin, Framebender and Peter Katz)
Rush: Time Machine 2011: Live in Cleveland (Scot McFadyen, Sam Dunn and Peggi Cecconi)
Tegan and Sara: Get Along (Elinor Svoboda-Salazar, Tegan Quin, Sara Quin, Piers Henwood and Nick Blasko)

Recording Package of the YearWinner: Jeff Harrison (Designer) and Kim Ridgewell (Illustrator) for Rest of the Story (Chris Tarry)
Feist, Metals (Janine McInnes, Robyn Kotyk, Graydon Sheppard, Sammy Rawal, Petra Cuschieri and Heather Goodchild)
Laura Repo, Get Yourself Home (Kirsten Gauthier, Anthony Swaneveld, Steve Dunk and Janet Kimber)
Dinah Thorpe, 12 (Jayme Spinks and Dinah Thorpe)
Timber Timbre, Creep on Creepin' On (Taylor Kirk, Robyn Kotyk and Nina Nielsen)

Video of the Year
 Mike Roberts ("Rumbleseat", The Sadies)'
Jon Busby ("Rows of Houses", Dan Mangan)
José Lourenço ("Stamp", The Rural Alberta Advantage)
Michael Maxxis ("Good Day at the Races", Hollerado)
John JP Poliquin ("The Stand", Mother Mother)

Compilation album

Universal Music Canada released a compilation album of songs from the year's Juno nominees on 13 March 2012. It debuted on the Canadian Albums Chart at number 32.

References

External links
 Juno Awards official site

2012
2012 in Canadian music
2012 music awards
Music festivals in Ottawa
2010s in Ottawa
2012 in Ontario
March 2012 events in Canada
April 2012 events in Canada